Ik-Vershina (Iq-Verşina) is a rural locality (a village) in Malinovsky Selsoviet, Belebeyevsky District, Bashkortostan, Russia. The population was 18 as of 2010. There is 1 street.

Geography 
Ik-Vershina is located 22 km south of Belebey (the district's administrative centre) by road. Fyodorovka is the nearest rural locality.

References 

Rural localities in Belebeyevsky District